Camp Gordon Johnston was a World War II United States Army training center located in Carrabelle, Florida, United States. The site's history is featured at the Camp Gordon Johnston Museum.

History
Camp Gordon Johnston opened in September 1942 as Camp Carrabelle and was later named after Colonel Gordon Johnston, a well-decorated soldier who served in the Spanish–American War in Cuba with the Rough Riders, in the Philippine–American War, and in World War I.

The camp at  served as an amphibious training base housing around 10,000 troops at one time and rotating between 24,000 and 30,000 soldiers from 1942 through 1946. The nearby islands of Dog Island and St. George Island were used as landing points for exercises.

Units
Units stationed at Camp Gordon Johnston:
 Hq. & Hq. Company, 3rd ESB
 HQ Medical Detachment
 1061st Port Construction and Repair Group
 1463rd Engineer Maintenance
 563rd Engineer Boat Maintenance
 375 Transportation Corps Harbor Craft
 22nd Infantry, 4th Infantry Division
 105th Harbor Craft Training Reg. & Coast Guard Detachment
 332nd, 339th, 352nd, 353rd, 356th, 376th, 377th Harbor Craft
 534th, 544th, 593rd, 584th EB & SR
 Engineer Special Brigades
 Amphibious Training Center
 534th Scouts
 351st 5th Platoon

In 1946, many buildings, facilities and the land was sold as war surplus. Officers quarters later became the retirement community of Lanark Village.

References

 Kilroy Was Here: Camp Gordon Johnson
 "Camp Johnston is Remembered" by Mays Leroy Gray writing in the Wakulla News, February 27, 1997

External links

 History of  U.S. Army amphibious training. Has a chapter on Camp Gordon Johnston
 Camp Gordon Johnston Museum
 WFSU Florida War Diaries

Buildings and structures in Franklin County, Florida
Military installations established in 1942
Gordon Johnston
1942 establishments in Florida
1946 disestablishments in Florida